The Principia Discordia is the first published Discordian religious text. It was written by Greg Hill (Malaclypse the Younger) with Kerry Wendell Thornley (Lord Omar Khayyam Ravenhurst) and others. The first edition was printed allegedly using Jim Garrison's Xerox printer in 1963. The second edition was published under the title Principia Discordia or How The West Was Lost in a limited edition of five copies in 1965. The phrase Principia Discordia, reminiscent of Isaac Newton's 1687 Principia Mathematica, is presumably intended to mean Discordant Principles, or Principles of Discordance.

The Principia describes the Discordian Society and its Goddess Eris, as well as the basics of the POEE denomination of Discordianism. It features typewritten and handwritten text intermixed with clip art, stamps, and seals appropriated from other sources.

While the Principia is full of literal contradictions and unusual humor, it contains several passages which propose that there is serious intent behind the work, for example a message scrawled on page 00075: "If you think the PRINCIPIA is just a ha-ha, then go read it again."

The Principia is quoted extensively in and shares many themes with the satirical 1975 science fiction book The Illuminatus! Trilogy by Robert Shea and Robert Anton Wilson. Wilson was not directly involved in writing the Principia.

Notable symbols in the book include the Apple of Discord, the pentagon, and the "Sacred Chao", which resembles the Taijitu of Taoism, but the two principles depicted are "Hodge" and "Podge" rather than yin and yang, and they are represented by the apple and the pentagon, and not by dots. Saints identified include Emperor Norton, Yossarian, Don Quixote, and Bokonon.  The Principia also introduces the mysterious word "fnord", later popularized in The Illuminatus! Trilogy; the trilogy itself is mentioned in the afterword to the Loompanics edition, and in the various introductions to the fifth editions.

Overview

The Principia Discordia holds three core principles: the Aneristic Principle (order), the Eristic Principle (disorder) and the notion that both are mere illusions. The following excerpt summarizes these principles:

History

The Principia Discordia or How The West Was Lost was first published in a limited edition of five copies and released into the public domain in 1965. The full title of the fourth and most well-known edition is Principia Discordia or How I Found Goddess And What I Did To Her When I Found Her: The Magnum Opiate Of Malaclypse The Younger, Wherein is Explained Absolutely Everything Worth Knowing About Absolutely Anything. Included on page 00075 is the following note about the history of the Principia:
"This being the 4th Edition, March 1970, San Francisco; a revision of the 3rd Edition of 500 copies, whomped together in Tampa 1969; which revised the 2nd Edition of 100 copies from Los Angeles 1969; which was a revision of PRINCIPIA Discordia or HOW THE WEST WAS LOST published in New Orleans in 1965 in five copies, which were mostly lost."

Additionally, the "contents of this edition" note in the Loompanics edition identifies the fourth edition as having originally been published by Rip Off Press of San Francisco, California.

A "Fifth Edition" consisting of a single Western Union telegram page filled with the letter M was published as an appendix to the Loompanics and SJ Games re-printings of the 4th Edition.

In 1978, a copy of a work from Kerry Thornley titled "THE PRINCIPIA Discordia or HOW THE WEST WAS LOST" was placed in the HSCA JFK collections as document 010857. Adam Gorightly, author of The Prankster and the Conspiracy about Kerry Thornley and the early Discordians, said the copy in the JFK collection was not a copy of the first edition but a later and altered version containing some of the original material.  In an interview with researcher Brenton Clutterbuck,  Gorightly said he had been given Greg Hill's copy of the first edition. This appeared in its entirety in Historia Discordia, a book on Discordian history released in spring of 2014.

The Principia includes a notice which purports to disclaim any copyright in relation to the work: "Ⓚ All Rites Reversed – reprint what you like."  Regardless of the legal effect of this notice, the Principia has been widely disseminated in the public domain via the Internet and more traditional print publishers. Some re-publishers have claimed copyright in relation to the additional material included in their editions.

Reprints of the fourth and fifth editions

 Revisionist Press published a red hardcover of the Fourth Edition in 1976, adding a stamp reading "This work is a bridge so move on thru" to the right of the golden apple on page 00075.
 Loompanics Unlimited published a version (the "yellow cover version") in 1979, adding an introduction by Robert Anton Wilson, an afterword by Malaclypse the Younger, and the aforementioned "Fifth Edition".  This version is reprinted by Paladin Press under .
 Steve Jackson Games published a version (the "black cover version") in 1994, adding an introduction by Steve Jackson and 20 pages of new Discordian text, mostly collected from online Discordians.   Steve Jackson Games also publishes Discordian and Illuminati-inspired games, such as GURPS Illuminati and the Illuminati card game.
 Last Word Press, of Olympia, Washington, released a series of reprints of the Loompanics/Paladin Press editions beginning in 2009, with a series of different cover designs and paper stocks, including a rainbow edition. Their 2015 edition is printed under .
FSoF Cabal's publishing division has published the "Evangelical" edition since 2009.

Mythology 
In Discordian mythology, Aneris is described as the sister of Eris aka Discordia. Whereas Eris/Discordia is the Goddess of Disorder and Being, Aneris/Harmonia is the Goddess of Order and Non-Being.

"DOGMA III – HISTORY 32, 'COSMOGONY'" in Principia Discordia, states

In the beginning there was VOID, who had two daughters; one (the smaller) was that of BEING, named ERIS, and one (the larger) was of NON-BEING, named ANERIS.

The sterile Aneris becomes jealous of Eris (who was born pregnant), and starts making existent things non-existent. This explains why life begins, and later ends in death.

And to this day, things appear and disappear in this very manner.

The names of Eris and Aneris (who are later given a brother, Spirituality), are used to show some fundamental Discordian principles in "Psycho-Metaphysics":

The Aneristic Principle is that of APPARENT ORDER; the Eristic Principle is that of APPARENT DISORDER. Both order and disorder are man made concepts and are artificial divisions of PURE CHAOS, which is a level deeper than is the level of distinction making.

Discordian works

See also
 Immanentize the eschaton

References

External links

The History and Lifecycle of the Principia Discordia

Online versions
 The original text version − Principia Discordia on www.cs.cmu.edu or Principia Discordia on www.ology.org
 The visually true-to-the-original (with images and stamps) version − Principia Discordia at PrincipiaDiscordia.com

Discordian texts
Discordianism
1965 non-fiction books
Loompanics books
Public domain books
Criticism of religion
Collaborative non-fiction books